Swedish relay is an athletics track event in which teams comprise four runners. The first runner runs 100 meters, the second one 200 m, the third one 300 m and the fourth runner 400 m, so the total length of the race is one kilometer.

Usually Swedish relay is run in the competitions of children and youth, but it has also been run in the DN-Galan, Super Grand Prix competition in Stockholm. It is also contested at Norwegian Championships; the most successful clubs historically being IK Tjalve, IL i BUL and IL Gular.

The unofficial world record has been set by  a team of four Jamaicans,  Christopher Williams, Usain Bolt, Davian Clarke and Jermaine Gonzales at the DN Galan of 25 July 2006 with 1:46.59.

The medley relays have been a regular part of the World Youth Championships in Athletics and were contested by continental teams at the 2010 Summer Youth Olympics in this format.

All-time top 25

Men

Women

References

Track relay races
Athletics (track and field) competitions
Running by type
Athletics by type
Events in track and field